The Monreal Stones (Filipino: Mga Batong Monreal), also referred to as the Ticao stones, are two limestone tablets that contain Baybayin characters. Found by pupils of Rizal Elementary School on Ticao Island in Monreal town, Masbate who had scraped the mud off their shoes and slippers on an irregular-shaped limestone tablet before entering their classroom, these are now housed in a section of the National Museum. The large, triangular stone weighs 30 kilos, is 11 centimeters thick, 54 cm. long and 44 cm. wide. The smaller stone is oval-shaped and is 6 cm. thick, 20 cm. long and 18 cm. wide. The National Museum held a Baybayin conference to present the Monreal Stones to the public on 13 December 2013.

The dating and authenticity of the stones are still under discussion, however initial examination has revealed that the inscriptions could not have been made earlier than the 17th century due to the usage of the Baybayin vowel deleter introduced in 1621 by the Spanish friars.

See also
 Laguna Copperplate Inscription
 Butuan Ivory Seal
 Suyat
 History of the Philippines (900-1521)
 Archaeology of the Philippines

References

Archaeology of the Philippines
Primary sources for early Philippine history
Hinduism in the Philippines
History of the Philippines (900–1565)
Philippine scripts
Collections of the National Museum of the Philippines
History of Laguna (province)
17th-century inscriptions
1989 archaeological discoveries